The 1989 du Maurier Classic was contested from June 29 to July 2 at Beaconsfield Golf Club. It was the 17th edition of the du Maurier Classic, and the 11th edition as a major championship on the LPGA Tour.

This event was won by Tammie Green.

Final leaderboard

External links
 Golf Observer source

Canadian Women's Open
du Maurier Classic
du Maurier Classic
du Maurier Classic
du Maurier Classic
du Maurier Classic